Xiayi County is a county of the prefecture-level city of Shangqiu, Henan province, People's Republic of China, bordering Anhui province to the northeast and southwest. It has a population of about 1.11 million.

Administrative divisions
As 2012, this county is divided to 8 towns and 16 townships.
Towns

Townships

Climate

References

County-level divisions of Henan
Shangqiu